Klyuchi is a rural locality (a selo) in Klyuchevskoy Selsoviet of Konstantinovsky District, Amur Oblast, Russia. The population was 763 as of 2018. There are 4 streets.

Geography 
Klyuchi is located 17 km northeast of Konstantinovka (the district's administrative centre) by road. Krestovozdvizhenka is the nearest rural locality.

References 

Rural localities in Konstantinovsky District